Gurkhun is a rural locality (a selo) in Dyubeksky Selsoviet, Tabasaransky District, Republic of Dagestan, Russia. The population was 484 as of 2010.

Geography 
Gurkhun is located 18 km north of Khuchni (the district's administrative centre) by road. Khustil is the nearest rural locality.

References 

Rural localities in Tabasaransky District